Minshull is a surname, and may refer to:

John Minshull (c. 1741 – 1793), English cricketer
Lee Minshull (born 1985), English footballer
Ray Minshull (1920–2005), English footballer
Richard Minshull (died 1686), English academic

See also
John Minshull-Ford (1881–1948), British Army officer